Lesbian, gay, bisexual and transgender rights in the Brazilian state of São Paulo are liberal. Same-sex marriage is legally performed in the state, as in Brazil as a whole.

Laws against homosexuality
Homosexuality is legal in São Paulo State.

Hate crimes and discrimination law

The São Paulo Law No. 10 948 went into effect on 5 November 2001, providing for penalties to be applied to the practice of discrimination on grounds of sexual orientation and other measures.

LGBT adoption
In 2006, a male gay couple from Catanduva, São Paulo officially adopted a five-year-old girl.

Same-sex marriage
On December 18, 2012, the Justice Court of São Paulo state ordered all notaries statewide to open marriages licenses for same-sex couples, becoming the most populous Brazilian state to offer same-sex marriages in a manner that is equal to other marriages.

LGBT life

Cultural expression
According to the Guinness World Records, the São Paulo Gay Pride Parade is the world's largest LGBT Pride celebration, with 4 million people in 2009. In 2007, in its eleventh edition, the São Paulo Gay Pride Parade broke its own record as the biggest parade in the world and attracted 3.5 million people.

Rights advocacy
SOMOS, an LGBT rights organization, was established in 1980 in São Paulo, at the same time as Grupo Gay da Bahia was established in Bahia.

Homophobia
In 2005, the Latin American Center of Human Rights in Sexuality (Clam) interviewed participants in the São Paulo Gay Pride Parade and found that 65% of their respondents had experienced hate speech and/or suffered physical aggression.

The Richarlyson affair occurred in which a judge was brought before the Justice Council of São Paulo for stating in court that soccer is a "virile, masculine sport and not a homosexual one." However, afterwards the same judge apologized and afterwards decided to annul the decision he wrote.

References

Sao Paulo (state)
Politics of São Paulo (state)